Dolenje Gradišče is a small settlement in the Municipality of Dolenjske Toplice in Slovenia. It lies at the confluence of the Sušica River with the Krka River in the historical region of Lower Carniola. The municipality is included in the Southeast Slovenia Statistical Region. 

A prehistoric hill fort has been identified just north of the settlement.

References

External links
Dolenje Gradišče on Geopedia

Populated places in the Municipality of Dolenjske Toplice